Peter Propping (21 December 1942 – 26 April 2016) was a German Human geneticist.

The scientific work of Propping spans genetically complex diseases, especially affecting brain function such as alcoholism, manic depressive disorders, schizophrenia, epilepsy, and in addition hereditary cancer predispositions. He also studied the history of human genetics and eugenics. From 1984 to 2008 he was director of the Institute of Human Genetics of the University of Bonn.

Biography 
Peter Propping studied medicine at the Free University of Berlin from 1962 to 68, receiving his MD degree in 1970 based on experimental work in pharmacology. After having received his license to practise medicine he became a research assistant at the Institute of Anthropology and Human Genetics of the University of Heidelberg. From 1980 to 83 Propping was a Heisenberg fellow for psychiatric genetics of the German Research Council. During this time he worked both at the Central Institute of Menthal Health in Mannheim and at the Institute of Anthropology and Human Genetics of the University of Heidelberg. From 1984 to 2008 Propping was a full professor of human genetics and director of the Institute of Human Genetics of the University of Bonn. He was dean of the faculty of medicine from 1990 to 1992, and vice rector for research of the University of Bonn from 1994 to 96. In 1995 he received the newly introduced recognition as a specialist in human genetics by the German Medical Association. From 1991 to 97 he coordinated the research programme on "Genetic factors in psychiatric disorders" of the German Research Council, and from 1996 to 2004 he was speaker of the graduate college "Pathogenesis of disorders of the central nervous system". From 1999 to 2012 Propping coordinated the German HNPCC consortium supported by the German Cancer Aid. From 2006 to 08 he chaired the German Society of Human Genetics. After becoming an emeritus in 2008 he was named Senior Professor by the rector of the University of Bonn.

Scientific contributions 
Propping could show that the intra-animal culture of bacteria (host-mediated assay) designed to induce mutations by chemical agents reflects the metabolism of the host. He also compiled findings reported in the literature that point to the genetic influence on drug effects on brain function. In a large twin study and in carriers of the normal electroencephalogram (EEG) he could show that the effect of ethanol on the EEG is strongly influenced by genetic factors. In addition, the metabolism of alcohol is under genetic control. In Bonn, Propping initiated a long term study in order to analyse the genetic contribution to manic depression. In contrast to the expectation that was widespread among researchers it was not possible to pin down genetic factors through the linkage approach. In rare forms of epilepsy, however, mutated genes could be uncovered through positional cloning. Propping was also involved in large international studies that made use of the method of genome-wide association analysis (GWAS). It turned out that there exists a genetic overlap between various mental disorders. In familial adenomatous polyposis Propping and his research group could refine the genotype-phenotype-relationship. In the most frequent form of inherited colorectal cancer (HNPCC, Lynch syndrome) Propping's group could define several relationships between genotype and phenotype that play a role for genetic transmission, diagnostics, prognosis, and cancer prevention.

Honors and awards
Propping received the following awards for his merits in medical genetics :

 2003 Mendel-Medal of the Leopoldina 
 2004 Honorary professor of the University of Nanjing
 2004 Johann-Georg-Zimmermann-Medal 
 2004 Lifetime Achievement Award of the International Society of Psychiatric Genetics
 2005 Emil Kraepelin Professor for Psychiatry at the Max Planck Institute of Psychiatry
 2010 German Cancer Aid Award
 2011 Karl-Heinrich-Bauer-Medal
 2014 Felix Burda Award as member of the German HNPCC-Konsortium 
 2014 Medal of honour of the German Society of Human Genetics

Memberships 
In 1997 he was a member of the Advisory Board of the German Cancer Aid and became chairman in 2003. From 1999 to 2007 he was a member of the board of directors of the German Reference Center on Ethics in the Biosciences at the University of Bonn, and from 2001 to 2007 a member in the project team of the National German Genome Research Network (NGFN) of the Federal Ministry of Education and Research (BMBF). From 2001 to 2007 he was a member of the National Ethics Council, established by the German government. In 2001 Propping was admitted to the Academy of Sciences Leopoldina and became a member of the Senate in 2008. Since 2010 he is a presidium member of the Academy of Sciences Leopoldina. From 2008 to 2012 he was a member of the University Council to the University of Bonn.

Books
 F. Vogel, P. Propping: Ist unser Schicksal mitgeboren? Berlin 1981
 P. Propping: Psychiatrische Genetik. Befunde und Konzepte. Berlin / Heidelberg / New York 1989
 P. Propping, H. Schott (Hrsg.): Wissenschaft auf Irrwegen. Biologismus-Rassenhygiene-Eugenik. Bonn/Berlin 1992
 T.. J. Bouchard, P. Propping (Hrsg): Twins as aTool of Behavioral Genetics. Chichester./. New York ./. Brisbane ./. Toronto ./. Singapore ./. 1993 
 L. Honnefelder, P. Propping (Hrsg.): Was wissen wir, wenn wir das menschliche Genom kennen? Köln 2001
 L. Honnefelder, D. Mieth, P. Propping (Hrsg.): Das genetische Wissen und die Zukunft des Menschen. Berlin 2003

External links 
 Peter Propping CV
 Interview with Prof. Dr. med. Peter Propping, Human geneticist: Specialised human geneticists would be an option. (German language). Dtsch Ärztebl 2013; 110(25): A-1251 / B-1093 / C-1085
 MZ-Interview with Peter Propping: Track down the risk. (German language)
 Eine Entscheidung um mehr zu wissen“  (18.05.2013). Prof. Dr. Peter Propping Interview to congenital breast cancer. Leopoldina National Academy of Sciences
 Auf dem Wege zur perfekten Rationalisierung der Fortpflanzung? Perspektiven der neuesten genetischen Diagnostik. Documentation of the Leopoldina-Talk 16 and 17 February 2013 in Halle (Saale). Editors von Peter Propping and Heinz Schott (German language)
 EuroNews – Agora – Genetik und Versicherung – ein Test für.. (YouTube) Interview with Peter Propping and Angus MacDonald (German language)

References  

1942 births
2016 deaths
German geneticists
Academic staff of the University of Bonn
Free University of Berlin alumni
Scientists from Berlin
Human geneticists